Gadessa albifrons is a moth in the family Crambidae. It was described by Frederic Moore in 1886. It is found in Sri Lanka.

References

Moths described in 1886
Spilomelinae